The men's road race at the 1936 UCI Road World Championships was the tenth edition of the event. The race took place on Sunday 6 September 1936 in Bern, Switzerland. The race was won by Antonin Magne of France.

Final classification

References

Men's Road Race
UCI Road World Championships – Men's road race